Lupinus odoratus is a species of lupine known by the common name Mojave lupine. It is native to the Mojave Desert and adjacent western Great Basin in the United States, where it grows in sandy or gravelly soils in open habitat.

It is an annual herb growing 10 to 30 centimeters tall. Each palmate leaf is made up of 7 to 9 green leaflets up to 2 centimeters long. The herbage is generally hairless except for new growth.

The inflorescence is an upright spiral of many flowers each up to a centimeter long. The flowers are royal purple-blue in color with a white spot on their banners, and have a scent similar to that of violets. The fruit is a thin legume pod up to 2 centimeters in length.

References

External links
Photo gallery

odoratus
Flora of the California desert regions
Flora of the Great Basin
Flora of Arizona
Flora of Nevada
Natural history of the Mojave Desert
Taxa named by Amos Arthur Heller
Flora without expected TNC conservation status